This article lists the official squads for the 1995 Rugby World Cup in South Africa from 25 May to 24 June 1995.
Players marked (c) were named as captain for their national squad. All details, such as number of international caps and player age, are current as of the opening day of the tournament on 25 May 1995.

Pool A

Australia

Head coach:  Bob Dwyer

Canada

Head coach:  Ian Birtwell

Romania

Head coaches:  Mircea Paraschiv /  Constantin Fugigi

South Africa
James Dalton and Pieter Hendriks were banned from the tournament for fighting in their pool match against Canada and were replaced by Naka Drotské and Chester Williams respectively.

Head coach:  Kitch Christie

Pool B

Argentina

Head coaches:  Alejandro Petra and  Ricardo Paganini

England

Head coach:  Jack Rowell

Italy

Head coach:  Georges Coste

Western Samoa
Head coach:  Peter Schuster

Pool C

Ireland

Head coach:  Gerry Murphy

Japan

Head coach:  Osamu Koyabu

New Zealand

Head coach:  Laurie Mains

Wales

Head coach:  Alec Evans

Pool D

France

Head coach:  Pierre Berbizier

Ivory Coast

Head coach:  Claude Ezoua Manager:  Camille Anoma

Scotland

Head coach: Jim Telfer

Tonga

Head coach: Fakahau Valu

Notes

External links

Rugby World Cup squads
Squads